Angela Murdaugh is an American Catholic religious sister in the  Franciscan Sisters of Mary, a Certified Nurse‐Midwife. She was a pioneer in promoting nurse midwives and birth centers. Out of this passion, she founded the Holy Family Birth Center in Weslaco, TX in 1983.

The birthing center was successful in many ways and became a model for others. "By 2002 the infant mortality rate in Hidalgo County was cut in half due to the center, declared so successful that it was emulated nationally." She trained midwives there and worked with local schools and factories to teach about health, especially as related to pregnancy and baby care. She was involved in the developing of policies and laws related to midwifery practice and birth centers in Texas. On the national level she was also instrumental in writing National Association of Childbearing Center's Standards for Birth Centers. Also, she contributed to the recognition of nurse-midwives as qualified Medicaid providers, being honored by receiving the first Medicaid provider number issued to a nurse midwife in Texas.

Sr. Murdaugh "credits her decision to become a certified nurse midwife in part to Sr. Mary Charitas Iffrig, who introduced her to natural childbirth." She retired from Holy Family Birth Center in 2007.

Honors 
 Elected president of the American College of Nurse Midwives
 Midwives Alliance of North American gave her their highest honor—the Sage Femme Award
 Named to Texas Women's Hall of Fame (2002)
 Texas Nurse of the Year Award (1978), 
 American College of Nurse Midwives Hattie Hemschemeyer Award (1990) 
 Social Justice Award (1998) 
 Doctor of Humane Letters from Villanova University (2005)

Notes

External links
 Texas Women's Hall of Fame
 Franciscan Sisters of Mary website
 Holy Family Birth Center

Living people
Year of birth missing (living people)
Place of birth missing (living people)
American midwives
Franciscan nuns
20th-century American Roman Catholic nuns
21st-century American Roman Catholic nuns